Harrow Garden Village was a housing development in the 1930s around Rayners Lane Underground station in London, England, which until then had been a "country halt" on the Metropolitan line.  This was Metro-land's flagship development, begun in by E S Reid, with streets full of semi-detached houses fronted with bay windows and tiled roofs.

External links
 This is Romney Drive,The Drive,Vicarage way and adjacent lanes

Areas of London
History of the London Borough of Harrow